Events in the year 1675 in Japan.

Incumbents
Monarch: Reigen

Births
October 21 - Emperor Higashiyama (d. 1710)

References

 
1670s in Japan
Japan
Years of the 17th century in Japan